Hugh Long was a member of the Wisconsin State Assembly in 1848. He was a Democrat.

References

Year of birth missing
Year of death missing
Democratic Party members of the Wisconsin State Assembly